The Belize Red Cross Society was founded in 1950 by Dr. Daniel Tenenbaum of Belmopan City Hospital. Previously it was part of the British Red Cross. It has its headquarters in Belize City.

See also
 Elaine Middleton, long-serving director-general

External links
IFRC Belize Red Cross Society Profile

Red Cross and Red Crescent national societies
Organizations established in 1950
1950 establishments in British Honduras
Medical and health organisations based in Belize